Protocheirodon pi, is a South American species of fish in the family Characidae found in Amazonas-Solimões, Purus, Madeira and Ucayali rivers. This species is the only member of its genus.

References

Characidae
Fish of South America
Monotypic fish genera
Fish described in 1978